Bolt is a free, open-source content management system based on PHP. It was released in 2012 and developed by Two Kings and the Bolt community. Bolt uses Twig for templates and includes features for content and user management. Bolt can be installed on any Apache or Nginx web server with SQLite, MySQL or MariaDB and PHP 7.2.9 or later.

See also
 Weblog software
 List of content management systems

References

Blog software
Content management systems
Free content management systems
Free software programmed in PHP
Website management
Software using the MIT license